The Imus City–AJAA Spikers (stylized as A✓AA) are a men's volleyball team based in Imus, Cavite which plays in the Spikers' Turf, a league in the Philippines.

History
The Imus City Spikers debuted at the 2022 PNVF Champions League for Men where they finished third.

Sponsored by Ivy Tuason Photography, Imus would enter the Spikers' Turf and play in the 2023 Open Conference.

References

Sports in Cavite
Men's volleyball teams in the Philippines